Sturton Grange is a civil parish in the City of Leeds in West Yorkshire, England. It has a population of 417, reducing to 403 at the 2011 Census.

Most of the parish area is used for agriculture. Soft fruit is grown here at an industrial scale. Population is concentrated in the northwest near the boundary with Garforth. The M1 motorway passes through the northern parts of the parish, the Leeds to Selby railway through the southern parts. Garforth Airfield is located north of the railway near the centre of the parish area.

Listed buildings
The parish contains two listed buildings that are recorded in the National Heritage List for England. Both the listed buildings are designated at Grade II, the lowest of the three grades, which is applied to "buildings of national importance and special interest". The parish is almost completely agricultural, and the listed buildings consist of a railway bridge and a milestone.

References

Bibliography

Places in Leeds
Civil parishes in West Yorkshire